Osterburg was a Verwaltungsgemeinschaft ("collective municipality") in the district of Stendal, in Saxony-Anhalt, Germany. It was disbanded on 1 July 2009. The seat of the Verwaltungsgemeinschaft was in Osterburg.

The Verwaltungsgemeinschaft Osterburg consisted of the following municipalities:

Ballerstedt 
Düsedau 
Erxleben 
Flessau 
Gladigau 
Königsmark 
Krevese 
Meseberg 
Osterburg
Rossau 
Walsleben

Former Verwaltungsgemeinschaften in Saxony-Anhalt